Al-Jenadriyah is a cultural and heritage festival held in Jenadriyah (or Janadriyah) near Riyadh in Saudi Arabia each year, lasting for two weeks. " King Abdullah bin Abdul Aziz was the first to organize this festival. He fostered it and developed it to become the top Arab festival that showcases the local heritage of all Arabian Peninsula regions as well as the Saudi Arabian heritage" 

It is organised by the National Guard, and the first was held in 1985. Activities include a camel race, performance of local music and dancing of the Ardah and the Mizmar. The festival draws more than one million visitors every year. The festival "normally falls during the month of February or March...Long ago, Janadriyah was known as 'Rowdhat Souwais' and was mentioned by numerous historians and writers."

In July 2019, the Saudi cabinet transferred the responsibility of organizing the festival to the Ministry of Culture after it was under the responsibility of the Ministry of National Guard.

Events and Activities 
The festival opens with the opening ceremony master, and then varied events held, including: 

 "Al Janadriya Operetta.
 Tourism Oasis. 
Saudi Ardah.
 Government Pavilions. 
 Provincial Pavilions. 
 Companies and Corporate wings. 
 Poetry Evenings. 
 Heritage Village Activity."

Camel racing
 Horse racing and endurance.
 Dancing.
 Folk costumes.
Book fair
 Centre for documentation and pictures
 Host country of the world to participate in the festival. In 2010, the French Republic participated in the Jenadriyah 25.
 Display of traditional crafts such as pottery, weaving, woodwork, metalwork, and leatherwork

Country participation in the festival  
Every year Saudi Arabia has hosted a guest of honor such as:

 In 2010, the French Republic participated in the Jenadriyah 25.

 Egypt was the guest of honor at Janadriyah 31, Germany at Janadriyah 30 and the UAE at Janadriyah 29.

 India was the guest of honor country at Janadriyah 32.

 Indonesia was the guest of honor country at the 33rd Janadriyah festival.

See also 

 Tourism in Saudi Arabia

References

External links
 Official website of the Festival 

Annual events in Saudi Arabia
Folk festivals in Saudi Arabia